A railway or railroad is a track where the vehicle travels over two parallel steel bars, called rails. The rails   support and guide the wheels of the vehicles, which are traditionally either trains or trams. Modern light rail is a relatively new innovation which combines aspects of those two modes of transport. However fundamental differences in the track and wheel design are important, especially where trams or light railways and trains have to share a section of track, as sometimes happens in congested areas.

Terminology 
 

Both trams and trains  have flanged steel wheels with a horizontal section transferring the vehicle  weight to the rail and a vertical flange "inboard" to guide the vehicle along the rail using its inside edge.

Difference in technique in curves
Rail vehicle wheels are usually mounted on a solid axle, so they turn at the same speed. When a vehicle turns the outer wheel has to travel further than the inner wheel. On a road vehicle, this is usually achieved by allowing the wheels to move independently, and fixing the front wheels in an arrangement known as Ackermann steering geometry.

Trains and trams can turn corners without wheel-slip because the outer horizontal part of the wheels has a slightly tapered rim. The guide flange (ridge) is on the inside to prevent the vehicle from slipping sideways off the rails. The horizontal (cone-shaped) rim makes contact with the slightly convex top of a steel rail in different (horizontal) places so that the outer wheel has a larger effective diameter than the inner wheel.

With both tram and train wheels, this happens naturally because the tires are cone shaped sloping surfaces: the inside diameter is a few millimeters larger than the outside. As the track starts to curve, the train tries to run straight. The wheel flange presses against the side of the curved rail so the "contact point" between rail and wheel moves a few millimeters outwards, making the effective diameter of the outer wheel temporarily larger, and equally opposite: the effective diameter of the inner wheel effectively becomes temporarily smaller. This technique works well on large-radius curves which are canted, but not as well on tight curves and railway switches (also known as "points"). This is because the geometry or cant of the track is more difficult to optimize for every possible combination of vehicle and direction of travel.

In sharp curves, the rail grooves are sometimes made very shallow, which causes the outer wheel to temporarily ride up onto the edge of its flange. This increases the wheel diameter and the curve can be taken more easily. In extreme cases, the rail has a groove so that the rim of the flange can take most of the weight, the "out-board" tire (on the outer radius of the outer rail) acting as no more than a vertical plate. 

In contrast, a train wheel is almost never designed to transfer weight through the flange rim, and some train wheels may be damaged if this should happen even once.

Track junctions 

The point where two straight but intersecting rails cross is called a frog. A groove through each rail allows the wheel flanges to pass through the intersecting rails. Without countermeasures each wheel would dip into the groove and strike the frog point gap causing unacceptable wear. The point where two tracks join and the vehicle can take one of two directions is called a railway switch. This works on the same principle, except that the inner rail is almost continuous and the outer rail has a gap for the flange to pass through.

With a train this problem is solved by using a wide tire. Train rails usually cross at a shallow angle. In the middle of the interchange there is a supporting frog. The tire is guided on each side by guide rails and some portion of the tire always maintains rail contact. This method is not feasible with trams and light railways.

Tram tires are generally narrower than train tires. Trams use bigger crossing angles and tighter curve radii are more likely than for train tracks. To cope with this difficulty the wheels of trams temporarily transfer the weight of the tram onto the flange to reduce wear on both the frog point and the horizontal surface of the tram wheels. Train wheels are not designed to bear such weight on their flanges.

A tram wheel which runs on the flange rather than on the horizontal tyre has a larger effective diameter, so the distance travelled per revolution is greater. On the outside track of the curve this is an advantage. It may be necessary to compensate the inner wheel or allow for some slippage. Modern trams and trams tend to have thicker and wider tires which allow for a greater (horizontal) conical section and so greater effective diameter variation and turning ability.

Interoperability problems 

At the junctions of train tracks, the gap in the frog or switch rail is wide.   So trams can be accommodated.

The main problem with a train on tram rails is the relatively narrow width of frog and switch gaps and channels of the groove rails designed to accommodate the narrow flanges of tram wheels . The wider flanges of train wheels increase the risk of derailment at these points. On routes where train carriages are driven on tram tracks (as in the past in parts of The Hague), wider  grooves  are required as a compromise that is practical as wide grooved girder rail is available. A larger structure gauge would also be required   This was also done in Los Angeles and in Vancouver as well as elsewhere in North America. The usually or normally limited structure gauge, and tight curves, on tram tracks will also prevent trains from using tram tracks.

Quote: 
 Design tolerances
 Design tolerances that affect the lateral displacement of the body include the following:	
1. Lateral tolerance between wheels and rails	
Two types of flanges are permitted on railroad wheels - narrow and wide. The maximum
lateral movement T1 possible for a new wheel set centered on in-gage track is a function of
the flange type and is determined by the following formula:	
CAUTION: Use only English units in formulas in this recommended practice	

 T1 = .5[gt-(gw+2fn)]
 = .59375”  for narrow-flange wheels
 = .375" for wide-flange wheels	

Where: gt = standard track gage at a point “5/8” below top of rail = 56.5"
 
gw = minimum gage of wheel set between backs of flanges = 53”
 
fn = minimum thickness of new wheel flange = 1.15625” for narrow flange or = 1.375" for wide flange
 Note: The conversions are not in the original text and are for information only.	
Quoted from

Mixed vehicle rail design 

Rural and suburban lines can be made compatible for use by several types of vehicles. For example, the narrow gauge railway used by Charleroi Metro in Belgium is ridden by trams, but the tracks are built to train track standards. Trams nonetheless run smoothly on the old NMVB tram net in Anderlues, where shallow groove rails are used. Between The Hague and Rotterdam, an old railway line was converted for RandstadRail into a route able to carry both the Rotterdam Metro, which uses vehicles built to train standards as well as The Hague trams which uses vehicles built to tram standards. The Electroliners which ran out of Chicago on the Chicago North Shore and Milwaukee Railroad, and afterwards on the Norristown High Speed Line, were another example.

See also 

 Jacobs bogie
 Grooved rail
 Minimum railway curve radius
 Rail tracks
 Tramway track
 Wheel gauge
 Wheelset

References

External links 
 Wirth Girder Rail
 Grooved or girder rail
 MRT Track & Services Co., Inc / Krupp, T and girder rails, scroll down.
 The Electric Interurban Railways in America accessdate = 10 June 2014
 Trampower LR55 rail

Permanent way
Technological comparisons